Anne King Gregorie (c. May 20, 1887 – December 4, 1960) was a South Carolina historian,  and professor of history at Arkansas College and at the University of South Carolina where some of her papers are deposited.

Anne King was known as a "local historian" and can be marked as a member of society who was quite loyal and here for the good of South Carolina. She was a woman who cared deeply about South Carolina. Although she was not born in South Carolina, she enriched herself in the cultures and heritage, it being a part of her, and shared stories of the state through books and writings.

She graduated from Winthrop College in 1906 and studied at USC from 1924 to 1929, receiving her master's degree in 1926 and her Ph.D., the first woman to receive one from USC's history department, in 1929.

While still in school, she wrote a biography of Thomas Sumter in 1927. The biography worked to tell history in the most well-put and factual way possible through much research so that it could be used to teach and study. Throughout her life, she made a name for herself by being an author and editor.

She was a summer school teacher soon after at USC and then went to Alabama College to teach multiple history classes in 1931. After a significant decrease in college enrollment, she was let go in 1933. Before that, she was a professor at Arkansas College but resigned after the college board failed to discipline a male student in the same degree that they punished a female student for cheating.

Gregorie was also director of the South Carolina division of the National Historical Records Survey from 1936 to 1941.  From 1949 to 1958, she was editor for The South Carolina Historical Magazine. She served as president of the South Carolina Historical Association from 1958 to 1959.

Gregorie was born on May 20, 1887, in Savannah, Georgia, and was the daughter of Ferdinand Gregorie and Anne Palmer (Porcher).  She died on December 4, 1960, in Charleston, South Carolina.

Notes

References
 (Available through THE REPRINT COMPANY PUBLISHERS, Spartanbug S.C 29304)
 WorldCat

20th-century American historians
Writers from Savannah, Georgia
1887 births
1960 deaths
Historians of South Carolina
Lyon College
Winthrop University alumni
University of South Carolina alumni
University of South Carolina faculty
American women historians
20th-century American women writers
Historians from Georgia (U.S. state)